The City Hall of Old Colorado City is a Richardsonian Romanesque Revival building from the Old Colorado City of Colorado Springs, Colorado. It was a city hall after it was built in 1888, but shortly after was used for other purposes including Hibbits Antique & Furniture Store. The building is on the National Register of Historic Places.

History
It is a 2 storied building with a tower made of rough-textured stone and brick. The front of the built has 2 wagon doors under 2 masonry arches. Besides city offices, it was also first a jail and  firehouse. The tower originally probably had a bell to alarm residents of the fire. It was built for Old Colorado City that was incorporated in 1887 at a cost of $5,000.

Most of the brothels and saloons were located between the 2400 and 2700 blocks of Colorado Avenue, often requiring hiring of transportation to transport arrested individuals to the jail. A new building was built at 26th and Cucharras in the late 1880s to more conveniently place prisoners in jail.

The former city hall served as a school from 1892 to 1902. It was called Ward School and Whittier School. It was then a hotel. The building was a bottling plant and garage in the 1930s and 1940s. Since then, the building has been used for commercial buildings.

See also
 History of Colorado Springs, Colorado

References

Colorado State Register of Historic Properties
National Register of Historic Places in Colorado Springs, Colorado
City and town halls on the National Register of Historic Places in Colorado
City and town halls in Colorado
Buildings and structures completed in 1888
1888 establishments in Colorado